The 1900 Delaware football team represented Delaware College—now known as the University of Delaware–as an independent during the 1900 college football season. Led by fourth-year head coach Herbert Rice, Delaware compiled a record of 2–3–1.

Schedule

References

Delaware
Delaware Fightin' Blue Hens football seasons
Delaware football